The château fort de Lourdes (Gascon: Castèth de Lorda) is a historic castle located in Lourdes in the Hautes-Pyrénées département of France. It is strategically placed at the entrance to the seven valleys of the Lavedan. Since 1933, it has been listed as a monument historique by the French Ministry of Culture.

History
Besieged in 778 by Charlemagne, it became the residence of the Counts of Bigorre in the 11th and 12th centuries. In the 13th century, it passed into the possession of the Counts of Champagne, part of the kingdom of Navarre before coming under the crown of France under Philippe le Bel. It was ceded to the English by the Treaty of Brétigny in 1360, before returning to France at the start of the 15th century after two sieges. In the 17th century, the castle became a royal prison, and a state prison after the French Revolution, continuing in this role until the start of the 20th century when it became the Pyrenean Museum (Musée Pyrénéen) (1921) which it remains

Description
The castle's origins go back to Roman times. Various remains from this era (fragments of sculpture, votive offerings, wall foundations) were brought to light by military engineering work in the 19th century. However, a consequence of these works was the destruction of the greater part of the ancient walls. The finds are exhibited on the site.

Today, the oldest remains date from the 11th and 12th centuries and consist of the foundations of the present fortifications.

The castle was reinforced in the 13th and 14th centuries (construction of the keep), and again in the 17th and 18th centuries.

The Notre-Dame-du-Château chapel houses the furniture of the former parish church of Saint-Pierre de Lourdes, destroyed in 1904. The present chapel is constructed with recycled material from Saint-Pierre de Lourdes.

Photographic gallery

See also

 List of castles in France
 Lourdes

References and sources

 Lourdes de la Préhistoire à nos jours, Musée Pyrénéen, 1987.

External links
 Chateau Fort - Musée Pyrénéen - official site

Castles in Hautes-Pyrénées
Historic house museums in Occitania (administrative region)
Museums in Hautes-Pyrénées
Lourdes
History museums in France
Monuments historiques of Occitania (administrative region)